The Girl Said No (aka With Words and Music) is a 1937 American musical comedy film produced by Andrew L. Stone and Edward L. Alperson for Grand National Pictures and directed by Andrew L. Stone. The screenplay was written by Betty Laidlaw, Robert Lively and Andrew L. Stone. The film stars Robert Armstrong, Irene Hervey and Paula Stone. It uses musical numbers from Gilbert and Sullivan operas, and the story is about a shady bookie who is in love with a greedy dance hall girl and schemes to get her back after she rejects him.  Along the way, he revives a failing Gilbert and Sullivan troupe.

Plot synopsis
Jimmie (Robert Armstrong), a shady bookie, meets Pearl (Irene Hervey), a taxi dance hall girl. He takes her out on several dates, pretending to be a high profile producer. She is happy to spend his money extravagantly but refuses to be his girlfriend. To get revenge, Jimmie promises to make her a Broadway star and becomes her manager. He takes her to expensive dinners and meetings with people in the top entertainment circles.

Jimmie tricks Pearl into signing a contract under which most of her earnings go to him. He persuades a defunct Gilbert and Sullivan troupe to re-form, obtains an empty theatre for a night, and fills it by blackmail. They play The Mikado, which is deservedly a hit. Overwhelmed with regret over his deceit, he proposes, and she, overwhelmed with gratitude over his support, accepts.

Cast

 Robert Armstrong as Jimmie Allen
 Irene Hervey as Pearl Proctor / Peep-Bo
 Paula Stone as Mabel
 Edward Brophy as Pick
 William Danforth as Howard Hathaway / The Mikado
 Vera Ross as Beatrice Hathaway / Katisha
 Richard Tucker as Charles Dillon
 Harry Tyler as Chuck Fairfax
 Gwili Andre as Gretchen Holman
 Max Davidson as Max
 Josef Swickard as Jonesy
 Bert Roach as 	Sugar Plum
 Horace Murphy as 	Joe
 Vivian Hart as Beatrice / Pitti-Sing
 Frank Moulan as 	Mark / Ko-Ko
 Allen Rogers as John / The Minstrel
 Carita Crawford as Yum Yum
 Mildred Rogers as 	Peggy
 Arthur Kay as Adolph / Conductor
 Carl Stockdale as Lockwood - a Critic
 Claire Rochelle as 	Miss Pringle aka Angel 
 Rolfe Sedan as 	Headwaiter at the Ritz
 Isabel La Mal as 	Lady Sylvia 
 Lester Dorr as 	Dick Barnes - Theatre Manager

Production
Grand National Pictures obtained a license from the D'Oyly Carte Opera Company for the copyrights to use the Gilbert and Sullivan words and music in the film for distribution in the United States. It was stipulated, however, that if the film was to be distributed in the British Isles and elsewhere, then music from American operettas was to be used instead, because the D'Oyly Carte Opera Company was still touring the Gilbert and Sullivan operas at that time.

Awards
The film was nominated for an Academy Award in the category Best Sound (A. E. Kaye).

References

External links

 
 
 

1937 films
1937 musical comedy films
American musical comedy films
American black-and-white films
Films directed by Andrew L. Stone
Grand National Films films
Gilbert and Sullivan
1930s English-language films
1930s American films